Mounted infantry were infantry who rode horses instead of marching. The original dragoons were essentially mounted infantry. According to the 1911 Encyclopædia Britannica, "Mounted rifles are half cavalry, mounted infantry merely specially mobile infantry." Today, with motor vehicles having replaced horses for military transport, the motorized infantry are in some respects successors to mounted infantry.

History

Pre-gunpowder
The origins of mounted infantry go back to at least the beginnings of organised warfare. With the weight of ancient bronze armor, the opposing champions would travel to battle on chariots before dismounting to fight. With the evolution of hoplite warfare, some hoplites would travel to battle on horseback, before dismounting to take their place in the phalanx. The early pre-Marian Roman military had units consisting of infantrymen clinging to the saddles of the cavalry to take them to battle and then dismounting to fight. Gallic and Germanic warbands were reported to use double-riders, with a second warrior joining a horseman only for a short distance before dismounting to fight on foot.
The Han Dynasty also extensively used mounted infantry in their campaigns against the Xiongnu confederation. During many of the Han campaigns, the vast majority of the army rode on horseback;
either as mounted cavalry or mounted infantry who fought dismounted.
The Arabs, during their campaigns in the deserts of Mesopotamia and Syria against the Byzantines and Sassanids, used camels to enhance their mobility, marking a stark constrast to their enemies, especially in the desert environment. The Carolingians under Charlamagne also used horses as transport for the bulk of their army, and special care was taken to ensure the health, fodder, and availability of horses on-campaign.
Other notable infantry to use horses to enhance their mobility include the Genoese crossbowmen, and Viking raiders who would gather all the horses they could find in the vicinity of their landings.

Dragoons 

Dragoons originally were mounted infantry, who were trained in horse riding as well as infantry fighting skills. However, usage altered over time and during the 18th century, dragoons evolved into conventional light cavalry units and personnel. Dragoon regiments were established in most European armies during the late 17th century and early 18th century.

The name is possibly derived from a type of firearm (called a dragon) carried by dragoons of the French Army. There is no distinction between the words dragon and dragoon in French.

The title has been retained in modern times by a number of armoured or ceremonial mounted regiments.

19th century
With the invention of accurate and quick firing repeating pistols and rifles in the mid-19th century, cavalry started to become increasingly vulnerable. Many armies started to use troops which could either fight on horseback or on foot as circumstances dictated. Fighting on horseback with swords and lances would allow rapid movement without cover from enemy fire, whilst fighting on foot with pistols and rifles allowed them to make use of cover and to form defensive lines.

The first mounted infantry units were raised during the Mexican–American War (as the Regiment of Mounted Riflemen, but redesignated Third Cavalry Regiment in 1861), and others followed, for example in Australia in the 1880s. Terms such as "mounted rifles" or "Light Horse" were often used.  

The French Foreign Legion used mule-mounted companies from the 1880s.  Each mule was shared by two legionnaires, who took turns in riding it. This arrangement allowed faster and more prolonged marches that could cover 60 miles in one day.

In the Western Theater of the American Civil War, several infantry regiments were converted to mounted infantry and armed with repeating rifles. The Lightning Brigade at the Battle of Chickamauga was an example of these Union mounted infantry units.

In the British Army, infantry units in some parts of the British Empire had a mounted platoon for scouting and skirmishing. In addition, many locally raised units such as the Ceylon Mounted Rifles, Cape Mounted Rifles, Natal Carbineers and Marshall's Horse fought as mounted infantry. 

In the Second Boer War, the British copied the Boers and raised large forces of their own mounted infantry. Among various ad hoc formations, the Imperial Yeomanry was raised from volunteers in Britain in 1900 and 1901. Many of the contingents from Australia, Canada and New Zealand (e.g. the Australian Light Horse and the Canadian Mounted Rifles) were MI (mounted infantry), as well as locally raised irregulars like the Imperial Light Horse and South African Light Horse. As artillery was of limited use against scattered Boer guerrilla bands later in the war, the mounted personnel of Royal Artillery units were formed into Royal Artillery Mounted Rifles.

As part of the lessons learned from that war, British regular cavalry regiments were armed with the same rifle as the infantry and became well-trained in dismounted tactics. A version of the standard infantry rifle, the shorter-barreled LEC or "Lee-Enfield Cavalry Carbine Mark I" had been introduced in 1896.

20th century transition

Many European armies also used bicycle infantry in a similar way that mounted infantry used horses. However they were handicapped by the need for proper roads.

The Australian 4th Light Horse Brigade which took part in the cavalry charge in the Battle of Beersheba (1917) during World War I are labelled as mounted infantry brigade in popular media, however they were in fact mounted rifles as were the New Zealand Mounted Rifles Brigade which also took part in this battle. Mounted rifles regiments lack the mass of a mounted infantry battalions, as a light horse brigade could only muster as many rifles in the line as a single battalion. Consequently, their employment reflected this lack of mass, with the tactics seeking to harness greater mobility and fire to overcome opposition, rather than echeloned mass attacks.

Mounted infantry began to disappear with the shift from horses to motor vehicles in the 1920s and 1930s. Germany deployed a few horse-mounted infantry units on the Russian Front during the Second World War, and cyclist units on both fronts as well, and both Germany and Britain (which had used cyclist battalions in the First World War) experimented with motorcycle battalions.  Germany also utilized organic horse and bicycle mounted troops within infantry formations throughout World War Two, although bicycle use increased as Germany retreated into its own territory. Japan deployed cyclists to great effect in its 1941 to 1942 campaign in Malaya and drive on Singapore during World War II.  A horsed cavalry regiment of the Philippine Scouts assisted in the defense of the Philippines at the onset of World War II. The 10th Mountain Division of the U.S. Army also maintained a mounted reconnaissance troop throughout World War Two, which saw service in Italy and Austria during the war.

Countries with entrenched military traditions, such as Switzerland, retained horse-mounted troops well into the Cold War, while Sweden kept much of its infantry on bicycles during the snow-free months.

See also 
 Dragoons
Foot cavalry
Australian Light Horse 
Canadian Mounted Rifles 
Grey's Scouts 
Imperial Yeomanry 
Camel Corps 
Imperial Camel Corps

References and notes

External links

 Society of the Military Horse

Military equestrianism
Cavalry
Combat occupations
Infantry
Obsolete occupations